Penn's Rocks is a  biological Site of Special Scientific Interest north of Crowborough in East Sussex.

This site is a steep sided valley on sandstone with many mosses and liverworts, which is a nationally rare habitat. Uncommon species include Orthodontium gracile, Bazzania trilobata, Saccogyna viticulosa and Harpanthus scutatus.

This site is in four separate areas. A footpath runs through one of them but the others are private land.

References

Sites of Special Scientific Interest in East Sussex
Withyham